Turn of the century, in its broadest sense, refers to the transition from one century to another. The term is most often used to indicate a distinctive time period either before or after the beginning of a century or both before and after.

According to the Chicago Manual of Style online Q&A, there is no common agreement as to the meaning of the phrase "turn of the n-th century." For instance, if a statement describes an event as taking place "at the turn of the 18th century," it could refer to a period around the year 1701 or around 1800, that is, the beginning or end of that century. As a result, they recommend either using only "turn of the century," and only in a context that makes clear which transition is meant, or alternatively to use a different expression that is unambiguous. "Turn of the century" commonly meant the transition from the 19th century to the 20th century; however, as the generations living at the end of the 20th century survived into the 21st century, the specific number of the referenced century became necessary to avoid confusion.

See also
 Fin de siècle
 Gilded Age
 Information Age

References

Historical eras
English words and phrases